Vladimir Otašević (born 8 June 1986) is a Serbian retired football defender.

Club career
He was playing for Metalac Gornji Milanovac from 2004 to 2011 and he played on 207 league matches in 3 different leagues.

In 2011, he signed for Spartak Subotica, and stayed in club for season and half. Then, he left to Radnički Kragujevac.

He joined Radnički Kragujevac in 2013. After a year in club, he broke the contract and left the club.

He signed for Novi Pazar in 2014. At the beginning of season 2014–15 he injured after one duel on the match versus his previous club, Radnički Kragujevac.

After ended contract with Novi Pazar, he signed with Mladost Lučani. He made 13 league appearances for Mladost Lučani in 2015.

Otašević returned to Metalac Gornji Milanovac in summer 2015.

Career statistics

References

External links
 

1986 births
Living people
People from Nova Varoš
Serbian footballers
Serbian SuperLiga players
FK Metalac Gornji Milanovac players
FK Spartak Subotica players
FK Radnički 1923 players
FK Novi Pazar players
FK Mladost Lučani players
FK Borac Čačak players
FK Javor Ivanjica players
Association football defenders